Montemarciano is a comune (municipality) in the Province of Ancona in the Italian region Marche, about  west of Ancona.

Montemarciano borders Chiaravalle, Falconara Marittima, Monte San Vito, and Senigallia.

International relations

Twin towns – Sister cities
Montemarciano is twinned with:
 Sinj, Croatia
 Quincy-sous-Sénart, France
 Höhenkirchen-Siegertsbrunn, Germany
 Bardejov, Slovakia
 Saue, Estonia

References

External links
 Official website

Cities and towns in the Marche